Unicorn Peak is a  mountain summit located within Olympic National Park in Clallam County of Washington state. Unicorn Peak is situated seven miles southwest of Port Angeles and three miles north-northwest of the park's Hurricane Ridge visitor center, in Daniel J. Evans Wilderness. Precipitation runoff from the mountain drains west to the Elwha River via Little River and Griff Creek.

History
This landform has also been called "Unicorn Peaks", and "The Pinchers", as in crab pinchers. This refers to the appearance of the summit and a 5,050-foot-elevation peak on the peak's northeast aspect, which is known as "Unicorn Horn". Klallam legend has it that during a great flood, canoes were tied to the mountaintop which broke off leaving only the two peaks, and the canoes and people in them floated to where Seattle is located.

Climate

Based on the Köppen climate classification, Unicorn Peak is located in the marine west coast climate zone of western North America. Most weather fronts originate in the Pacific Ocean, and travel east toward the Olympic Mountains. As fronts approach, they are forced upward by the peaks of the Olympic Range, causing them to drop their moisture in the form of rain or snowfall (Orographic lift). As a result, the Olympics experience high precipitation, especially during the winter months. During winter months, weather is usually cloudy, but due to high pressure systems over the Pacific Ocean that intensify during summer months, there is often little or no cloud cover during the summer. The months May through September offer the most favorable weather for viewing or climbing this peak.

Geology

The Olympic Mountains are composed of obducted clastic wedge material and oceanic crust, primarily Eocene sandstone, turbidite, and basaltic oceanic crust. The mountains were sculpted during the Pleistocene era by erosion and glaciers advancing and retreating multiple times.

See also

 Olympic Mountains
 Geology of the Pacific Northwest

Gallery

References

External links

 
 Weather forecast: Unicorn Peak

Olympic Mountains
Mountains of Washington (state)
Mountains of Clallam County, Washington
Landforms of Olympic National Park
North American 1000 m summits